Plumeria is a genus of flowering plants whose common name is Frangipani.

Frangipani or Frangipane may also refer to:

Frangipane, an almond-flavoured pastry filling
Frangipani, a 2004 novel by Tahitian writer Célestine Hitiura Vaite
Frangipani, a 2013 Sri Lankan film directed by Visakesa Chandrasekaram

People
Frangipani family, an Italian family that came to prominence in the Middle Ages
Cencio I Frangipane (1066?–1102?), Roman nobleman and consul
Cencio II Frangipane (early twelfth century), Catholic cardinal
Saint Ottone Frangipane (1040–1127), Italian monk and hermit
Oddone Frangipane (mid-twelfth century), military leader
William Frangipani (died 1337), Latin Archbishop of Patras
Alexander Mirto Frangipani (16th century), Roman Catholic prelate who served as Bishop of Caiazzo
Fabio Mirto Frangipani (died 1587), Roman Catholic prelate who served as Titular Archbishop of Nazareth
Gabriele Frangipani (born 2001), Italian figure skater
Giovanni Frangipane (1902–1967), Italian sprinter and football player
Jean Frangipani (16th century), Croat noble who acted as ambassador of France to the Ottoman court
Niccolò Frangipane (active 1565–97), Italian painter of the late Renaissance period
Ottavio Mirto Frangipani (1544–1612), Italian bishop and papal diplomat
Paolo Frangipane (born 1979), Argentine footballer
Ashley Frangipane (born 1994), American singer-songwriter known professionally as Halsey

See also
Fragipan, a type of layer in soil
House of Frankopan (Italian: Frangipani), a Croatian noble family